Mohammad Javad Bagher Tondguyan (16 June 1950 – 16 December 1991) was an Iranian engineer and petroleum minister under Prime Minister Mohammad-Ali Rajai from 2 September to 3 November 1980 when he was captured by the Iraqi forces in November 1980 during Iran-Iraq war.

Early life and education
Tondguyan was born on 16 June 1950.

He was involved in opposition movement against Shah Mohammad Reza Pahlavi in 1967 and was detained and interrogated by the SAVAK. During this period he met Mohammad Khatami. From 1968 to 1972 Tondguyan studied oil engineering at the Abadan Technologic Institute, now Petroleum University of Technology, where he was head of the Islamic Association. The association hosted Ali Shariati, one of the philosophical and political leaders of the Islamic revolution, as a speaker during the 1960s and 1970s. Tondguyan was also one of the figures who disseminated the views of Ayatollah Ruhollah Khomeini in Abadan during this period.

Career
Following his graduation, Tondguyan began to work in the Tehran refinery. Then he worked for various oil companies in Iran until the 1979 revolution. After the revolution, he was appointed deputy science minister.

In September 1980, Tondguyan was named oil minister replacing Ali Akbar Moinfar in the post and served in the cabinet of Mohammad Ali Rajai. His successor as the minister of oil was Mohammad Gharazi.

Captivity and death
Tondguyan was captured by the Iraqi forces on his tour to the fronts on the Abadan road  in Khuzestan Province on 3 November 1980 at the initial phase of the Iran-Iraq war which lasted from 1980 to 1988. His deputy and a ministry official were also captured with him. They were reportedly taken to Baghdad.

In October 1990, the Iraqi officials stated that he committed suicide two years after his captivity. In November 1990, his wife and father denied this report. Tondguyan's body was delivered by the 
International Committee of the Red Cross to the Iran government in 1991. The committee reported that he died of torture after eleven years of detention in Iraqi prisons.

Personal life
Tondguyan was married and had four children.

Notes

References

External links

20th-century Iranian engineers
20th-century Iranian politicians
1950 births
1991 deaths
Iran–Iraq War prisoners of war
Iranian prisoners of war
Iranian torture victims
National Iranian Oil Company people
Oil ministers of Iran
Petroleum engineers
Prisoners of war held by Iraq
Petroleum University of Technology alumni